"Carry Me, Carrie" is the third single by American country rock band Dr. Hook & the Medicine Show, released in 1972. It appeared on the group's second album, Sloppy Seconds.

Track listing

Personnel
 Ray Sawyer – lead vocals
 Dennis Locorriere – lead guitar, lead vocals
 George Cummings – steel, electric and Hawaiian guitars, backing vocals
 Rik Elswit – rhythm guitar
 Billy Francis – keyboards, backing vocals
 Jance Garfat – bass
 Jay David – drums, backing vocals

Charts

References

External links
 

1972 singles
1972 songs
Dr. Hook & the Medicine Show songs
Song recordings produced by Ron Haffkine
Songs written by Shel Silverstein
CBS Records singles
Columbia Records singles